Ernst Rost-Onnes (born 5 December 1985) is a Dutch-born Brazilian field hockey player. He competed in the men's field hockey tournament at the 2016 Summer Olympics.

References

1985 births
Living people
Field hockey players from Amsterdam
People with acquired Brazilian citizenship
Brazilian male field hockey players
Olympic field hockey players of Brazil
Field hockey players at the 2016 Summer Olympics